Niall O'Brien (8 February 1946 – 25 February 2009) was an Irish actor and member of the Abbey Theatre company, where he appeared in 130 productions.  He also appeared in many films and television programmes.

Early life
O'Brien was born to Maureen (née Wright) and Michael O'Brien on 8 February 1946. He was the youngest of five children.  He was born in Dalkey village, County Dublin, and grew up in nearby Glasthule.  He was educated at the CBS Westland Row, Dublin, before going on to join the Abbey School of acting.

Career
After completing his Leaving Certificate, O'Brien started a building apprenticeship.  Upon being accepted to the Abbey School of acting in the mid-1960s however, he took a year out of his apprenticeship to try a career as an actor and never went back to the construction industry.
  
In his career as an Abbey actor he took part in 130 theatre productions, including 27 world premiers.  His first part was in the play Galileo in 1965.  His last Abbey performance was appearing as Tom Mooney in Drama at Inis-Is Life Worth Living (2005).  Niall toured internationally with the Abbey in Europe, Russia and much of the US.

In 1994 he appeared in a play by Irish playwright Teresa Deevy  called "Katie Roche" where he played the part of Frank Lawlor.

O'Brien also appeared in numerous television and film appearances throughout his career.  These include the parts of Bernard in Ryan's Daughter (1971), Kay in Excalibur (1981), Owen McCarthy in The Year of the French (1982), Agent Rurik in Gorky Park (1983), Captain Twilley in Half Moon St (1986), Det. Insp. Isaac Gissing in Rawhead Rex (1986), Police Superintendent in The Playboys (1992), Josie McCarthy in Broken Harvest (1995) and Mr Moss in Vanity Fair (2004).  He also appeared in single episodes of TV series Lovejoy, Boon, A Touch of Frost, Bachelors Walk and The Royal. In 2007 he was directed in the short film Teeth by his son, Ruairí O'Brien.  This film went on to win awards at the Galway Film Fleadh and Brest European Short Film Festival .

Personal life
He married Brigid Sinnott and they had four children, residing from 1984 in Bray, Co. Wicklow.

Death
O'Brien died at home on 25 February 2009, from cancer, after a 20-month-long illness.

Filmography

Playography 
 Katie Roche 1994

References

External links

Niall O'Brien at The Abbey Theatre Archives
Niall O'Brien at The Teresa Deevy Archive
Teeth - short film on YouTube

1946 births
2009 deaths
Male actors from County Dublin
Irish male stage actors
Deaths from cancer in the Republic of Ireland